Trupanea novarae is a species of tephritid or fruit flies in the genus Trupanea of the family Tephritidae.

Distribution
Chile, Paraguay, Argentina, Brazil.

References

Tephritinae
Insects described in 1868
Diptera of South America